Luzonoparmena is a genus of longhorn beetles of the subfamily Lamiinae, containing the following species:

 Luzonoparmena habei Sato & Ohbayashi, 1979
 Luzonoparmena sierrana Vives, 2015

References

Parmenini
Cerambycidae genera